Grenada County is a county located in the U.S. state of Mississippi between Memphis and Jackson, Mississippi. As reported by the 2020 United States Census, the population was 21,629. Its county seat is Grenada. The county was named for the province of Granada in southern Spain but spelled inaccurately. Its western half is part of the Mississippi Delta. Cotton cultivation was important to its economy well into the 20th century.

The Grenada, MS Micropolitan Statistical Area includes all of Grenada County.

Geography

Major highways
  Interstate 55
  U.S. Highway 51
  Mississippi Highway 7
  Mississippi Highway 8
  Mississippi Highway 35

Adjacent counties
 Yalobusha County (north)
 Calhoun County (east)
 Webster County (southeast)
 Montgomery County (south)
 Carroll County (south)
 Leflore County (west)
 Tallahatchie County (northwest)

National protected area
 Tallahatchie National Wildlife Refuge (part)

Demographics

2020 census

As of the 2020 United States census, there were 21,629 people, 8,391 households, and 5,362 families residing in the county.

2019
As of the 2019 United States Census, there were 20,758 people living in the county. 

55.3% were White, 42.9% Black or African American, 0.5% Asian, 0.3% Native American, and 1.1% of two or more races. 1.6% were Hispanic or Latino (of any race).

There were 8,391 households. The median income for a household in the county was $40,122.

Employment 
According to the Greater Grenada Partnership, in 2020, the top 3 local employers were Modine, Lennox, and the Grenada School District Top regional employers include Winchester, Toyota Mississippi, and Franklin Corporation. The Bureau of Labor Statistics reports that Grenada has added 1,600 direct jobs between 2011 and 2019.

On April 20, 2021, Milwaukee Tool announced that the manufacturing company will expand in Mississippi by constructing an accessories manufacturing facility in Grenada County. The project is a $60 million corporate investment and will create 800 jobs at the Grenada location. 

According to a study commissioned by the Mississippi Development Authority and the Mississippi Department of Transportation, Grenada Railroad supports a total of 11,174 jobs, $1.3 billion in gross product and $1 billion in personal income.

Education
Grenada School District is the public school system.

Infrastructure 
U.S. Senators Roger Wicker, R-Miss., and Cindy Hyde-Smith, R-Mississippi, announced the award of a $6.22 million grant to Grenada Railroad, LLC., to complete the final phase of a project to refurbish a rail line between Canton, Mississippi, and Memphis, Tennessee. Work in progress on the northern 100-mile project is set for completion in 2021. The entire 188 miles of the Memphis, TN to Canton, MS line will be rated at 286,000 gross weight on rails (GWR) with an authorized speed of 40 MPH making it a Class III Short Line Railroad.

Communities

City
 Grenada (county seat)

Census-designated places
 Elliott
 Holcomb

Other unincorporated communities

 Bew Springs
 Glenwild
 Gore Springs
 Hardy
 Le Flore
 Oxberry
 Riverdale
 Tie Plant

Politics

See also

 National Register of Historic Places listings in Grenada County, Mississippi

External links
 Grenada County Sheriff's Office

References

 
Mississippi counties
1870 establishments in Mississippi
Populated places established in 1870